Henry Osborn may refer to:

 Henry Osborn (Royal Navy officer) (1694–1771), admiral, governor of Newfoundland, and Member of Parliament
 Henry Osborn (cricketer) (1823–?), English cricketer
 Henry Fairfield Osborn (1857–1935), American geologist, paleontologist, and eugenicist
 Henry Osborn (politician) (1859–1937), Australian politician
 Henry A. Osborn Jr. (1884–1918), American politician
 Henry Fairfield Osborn Jr. (1887–1969), son of the above, naturalist and conservationist

See also
Henry Osborne (disambiguation)
Harry Osborne (disambiguation)